Charles Ellsworth Gibson (November 17 1879 – November 22, 1954) was a Major League Baseball catcher.

Sources

Major League Baseball catchers
Philadelphia Athletics players
Sharon Steels players
Baseball players from Pennsylvania
People from Sharon, Pennsylvania
1879 births
1954 deaths